Taco Remkes (born 20 November 1984) is a Dutch professional golfer who currently plays on the European Tour.

Remkes earned his place on the European Tour for the 2009 season by winning three times on the Challenge Tour in 2008 on his way to 3rd on the final rankings. Thus far his best finish at the highest level is tied for 12th at the Joburg Open.

Professional wins (5)

Challenge Tour wins (3)

Challenge Tour playoff record (2–0)

EPD Tour wins (2)

See also
2008 Challenge Tour graduates
2011 European Tour Qualifying School graduates
List of golfers to achieve a three-win promotion from the Challenge Tour

External links

Dutch male golfers
European Tour golfers
Sportspeople from Amsterdam
1984 births
Living people
21st-century Dutch people